Armas Johannes Paasonen (29 August 1885, Viipuri – 15 November 1950) was a Finnish railwayman and politician.

Paasonen was a Member of the Parliament of Finland from 1911 to 1918, from 1924 to 1929, from 1930 to 1933 and again from 1936 to 1945, representing the Social Democratic Party of Finland (SDP).

He was imprisoned from 1918 to 1919 for having sided with the Reds during the Finnish Civil War.

References

1885 births
1950 deaths
Politicians from Vyborg
People from Viipuri Province (Grand Duchy of Finland)
Social Democratic Party of Finland politicians
Members of the Parliament of Finland (1911–13)
Members of the Parliament of Finland (1913–16)
Members of the Parliament of Finland (1916–17)
Members of the Parliament of Finland (1917–19)
Members of the Parliament of Finland (1924–27)
Members of the Parliament of Finland (1927–29)
Members of the Parliament of Finland (1930–33)
Members of the Parliament of Finland (1936–39)
Members of the Parliament of Finland (1939–45)
People of the Finnish Civil War (Red side)
Prisoners and detainees of Finland
Finnish people of World War II